Rampside railway station was located on the Piel Branch of the Furness Railway in the Rampside area of Barrow-in-Furness, England.

The single platform station opened from 24 August 1846 as Concle, being renamed Rampside in 1869. The station remained operational until 1936 when it closed along with the following station at Piel, which had been reachable via the Roa Island Causeway. The station building and entire branch line had been demolished by the 1980s.

References

Sources
 

Former buildings and structures in Barrow-in-Furness
Former Furness Railway stations
Railway stations in Great Britain opened in 1846
Railway stations in Great Britain closed in 1936
1846 establishments in England
Disused railway stations in Cumbria